Phintella is a genus of jumping spiders that was first described by W. Bösenberg & Embrik Strand in 1906.

Species
 it contains fifty-nine species and one subspecies, found in Oceania, Asia, Europe, and Africa:
P. abnormis (Bösenberg & Strand, 1906) – Russia (Far East), China, Korea, Japan
P. accentifera (Simon, 1901) – India, China, Vietnam
P. aequipeiformis Zabka, 1985 – China, Vietnam
P. aequipes (Peckham & Peckham, 1903) – Africa
Phintella a. minor (Lessert, 1925) – East Africa
P. africana Wesolowska & Tomasiewicz, 2008 – Ethiopia
P. arcuata Huang, Wang & Peng, 2015 – China
P. arenicolor (Grube, 1861) – Russia (Far East), China, Korea, Japan
P. argentea Kanesharatnam & Benjamin, 2019 – Sri Lanka
P. argenteola (Simon, 1903) – Vietnam
P. assamica Prószyński, 1992 – India, Laos
P. australis (Simon, 1902) – South Africa
P. bifurcata Prószyński, 1992 – India
P. bifurcilinea (Bösenberg & Strand, 1906) (type) – China, Korea, Vietnam, Japan
P. bunyiae Barrion & Litsinger, 1995 – Philippines
P. caledoniensis Patoleta, 2009 – New Caledonia
P. castriesiana (Grube, 1861) – Canary Is., Southern Europe, North Africa, Middle East, Turkey, Caucasus, Iran, Russia, Korea, Japan
P. cavaleriei (Schenkel, 1963) – China, Korea
P. clathrata (Thorell, 1895) – Myanmar
P. conradi Prószyński & Deeleman-Reinhold, 2012 – Indonesia (Sumatra)
P. coonooriensis Prószyński, 1992 – India
P. debilis (Thorell, 1891) – India to Taiwan, Indonesia (Java)
P. dives (Simon, 1899) – Indonesia (Sumatra)
P. fanjingshan Li, Wang, Zhang & Chen, 2019 – China
P. hainani Song, Gu & Chen, 1988 – China
P. incerta Wesolowska & Russell-Smith, 2000 – Tanzania
P. indica (Simon, 1901) – India
P. jaleeli Kanesharatnam & Benjamin, 2019 – Sri Lanka
P. kaptega Dawidowicz & Wesolowska, 2016 – Kenya
P. lajuma Haddad & Wesolowska, 2013 – South Africa
P. lepidus Cao & Li, 2016 – China
P. leucaspis (Simon, 1903) – Indonesia (Sumatra)
P. levii Huang, Wang & Peng, 2015 – China
P. linea (Karsch, 1879) – Russia (Far East), China, Korea, Japan
P. longapophysis Lei & Peng, 2013 – China
P. longlingensis Lei & Peng, 2013 – China
P. lucida Wesolowska & Tomasiewicz, 2008 – Ethiopia, Kenya
P. lunda Wesolowska, 2010 – Angola
P. macrops (Simon, 1901) – India
P. monteithi Zabka, 2012 – Australia (Queensland)
P. multimaculata (Simon, 1901) – Sri Lanka
P. nilgirica Prószyński, 1992 – India
P. paludosa Wesolowska & Edwards, 2012 – Nigeria
P. paminta Barrion, Barrion-Dupo & Heong, 2013 – China
P. panda Huang, Wang & Peng, 2015 – China
P. parva (Wesolowska, 1981) – Russia (Far East), China, Korea
P. piatensis Barrion & Litsinger, 1995 – Philippines
P. planiceps Berry, Beatty & Prószyński, 1996 – Caroline Is.
P. popovi (Prószyński, 1979) – Russia (South Siberia, Far East), China, Korea
P. pulcherrima Huang, Wang & Peng, 2015 – China
P. pygmaea (Wesolowska, 1981) – China
P. reinhardti (Thorell, 1891) – India (Nicobar Is.)
P. sancha Cao & Li, 2016 – China
P. suavis (Simon, 1885) – China, Nepal to Malaysia
P. suavisoides Lei & Peng, 2013 – China
P. suknana Prószyński, 1992 – India
P. tengchongensis Lei & Peng, 2013 – China
P. vittata (C. L. Koch, 1846) – India to Philippines
P. wulingensis Huang, Wang & Peng, 2015 – China
P. yinae Lei & Peng, 2013 – China

References

External links
 Photograph of P. castriesiana
 Photograph of Phintella sp.

Salticidae
Salticidae genera
Spiders of Africa
Spiders of Asia
Spiders of Australia
Taxa named by Embrik Strand